The 2005 NCAA Division I women's soccer tournament (also known as the 2005 Women's College Cup) was the 24th annual single-elimination tournament to determine the national champion of NCAA Division I women's collegiate soccer. The semifinals and championship game were played at Aggie Soccer Complex in College Station, Texas from December 2–4, 2005 while the preceding rounds were played at various sites across the country from November 10–25.

Portland defeated UCLA in the final, 4–0, to win their second national title.

The most outstanding offensive player was Christine Sinclair from Portland, and the most outstanding defensive player was Cori Alexander, also from Portland. Sinclair was also named MOP Offensive after Portland's first title in 2002. Sinclair and Alexander, alongside nine other players, were named to the All-Tournament team.

The tournament's leading scorer, with 8 goals and 1 assist, was Kara Lang from UCLA.

Qualification

All Division I women's soccer programs were eligible to qualify for the tournament. The tournament field remained fixed at 64 teams.

Format
Just as before, the final two rounds, deemed the Women's College Cup, were played at a pre-determined neutral site. All other rounds were played on campus sites at the home field of the higher-seeded team. The only exceptions were the first two rounds, which were played at regional campus sites. The top sixteen teams hosted four team-regionals on their home fields during the tournament's first weekend. Rather than being seeded 1 to 16, teams were seeded to 1 to 4 and placed in one of four main brackets.

National seeds

Records

Bracket

Penn State Bracket

Portland Bracket

UCLA Bracket

North Carolina Bracket

College Cup

All-tournament team
Cori Alexander, Portland (most outstanding defensive player)
Danesha Adams, UCLA
Lindsey Huie, Portland
Stephanie Lopez, Portland
 Erin McLeod, Penn State
Iris Mora, UCLA
Jill Oakes, UCLA
Megan Rapinoe, Portland
 Christine Sinclair, Portland (most outstanding offensive player)
India Trotter, Florida State
Angie Woznuk, Portland

See also 
 NCAA Women's Soccer Championships (Division II, Division III)
 NCAA Men's Soccer Championships (Division I, Division II, Division III)

References

NCAA
NCAA Women's Soccer Championship
NCAA Division I Women's Soccer Tournament
NCAA Division I Women's Soccer Tournament
NCAA Division I Women's Soccer Tournament